→

Greg Canuteson (born May 30, 1967) is an American lawyer and politician from Liberty, Missouri. A member of the Democratic Party, he served in the Missouri House of Representatives from 1992 through 1996. He later went on to be elected mayor of Liberty, Missouri in 2008.

References 

1967 births
Living people
Democratic Party members of the Missouri House of Representatives
Mayors of places in Missouri
Politicians from Madison, Wisconsin
People from Liberty, Missouri
Missouri lawyers